Yaakov Baruch (born November 14, 1982) is a leading Rabbi of the Sha'ar Hashamayim Synagogue, located in Tondano, Minahasa Regency, North Sulawesi.

Biography 
Yaakov Baruch was born and raised in a different religious family. Since childhood, his parents have instilled religious values in him. His father was a Minahasan Protestant and his late mother was a Mongondow Muslim. Since childhood, he has been accustomed to living in a family of different faiths, upholding the values ​​of tolerance.  

Yaakov Baruch decided to convert to Judaism after his mother's next-door grandmother told him that he had Jewish ancestry. When Yaakov Baruch decided to embrace Judaism, the religion of his ancestors, there was no opposition at all from his parents. "There is no problem, we can accept each other," he told tribunmanado.co.id, in 2018.

At that time he was in junior high school. Yaakov Baruch then traced his family tree and found out that he had Jewish ancestry.

His great-grandfather from his mother's line was Elias van Beugen who was a Dutch Jewish immigrant.  

Apart from being a rabbi, he is also a faculty at Sam Ratulangi University.

References 

1982 births
Minahasa people
Converts to Judaism from Protestantism
Converts to Judaism from Christianity
Indonesian former Christians
Indonesian religious leaders
Indonesian Jews
Indonesian rabbis
Indo people
Indonesian people of Jewish descent
Indonesian people of Dutch descent
Indonesian people of Dutch-Jewish descent
21st-century Jews
21st-century rabbis
Living people